Khrenovy Island is a small uninhabited island in the Ob Sea near Berd Spit.

History
Archaeologists have found a Bronze Age stone mace on the island.

Before the emergence of the Novosibirsk Reservoir, the island was the southern part of Berdsk.

References

Islands of Novosibirsk Oblast